Deborah Eisenberg (born November 20, 1945) is an American short story writer, actress and teacher. She is a professor of writing at Columbia University.

Early life
Eisenberg was born in Winnetka, Illinois. Her family is Jewish. She grew up in suburban Chicago, Illinois, and moved to New York City in the late 1960s.

Career 
Eisenberg was an editorial assistant at The New York Review of Books in 1973. She taught at the University of Virginia from 1994 until 2011, when she accepted a teaching position at Columbia University's MFA writing program.

Writing

Eisenberg has written five collections of stories: Transactions in a Foreign Currency (1986), Under the 82nd Airborne (1992), All Around Atlantis (1997), Twilight of the Superheroes (2006), and Your Duck Is My Duck (2018). Ben Marcus, reviewing Twilight of the Superheroes for The New York Times Book Review, called Eisenberg "one of the most important fiction writers now at work. This work is great." Her first two-story collections were republished in one volume as The Work (So Far) of Deborah Eisenberg (1997). Her first four collections were subsequently reprinted in The Collected Stories of Deborah Eisenberg (2010).

Eisenberg has also written a play, Pastorale, which was produced at Second Stage in New York City in 1982. She has written for such magazines as The New York Review of Books, The New Yorker, and The Yale Review. She is the credited screenwriter of the 2020 Steven Soderbergh film Let Them All Talk, for which she wrote a 50-page treatment from which the actors largely improvised the dialogue.

Awards

Eisenberg received the Rea Award for the Short Story in 2000, an award granted for significant contribution to the short story form. She has also received a Whiting Award and a Guggenheim Fellowship, both in 1987; and six O. Henry Awards, in 1986, 1995, 1997, 2002, 2006, and 2013.

In 2007, Eisenberg was elected into the American Academy of Arts and Letters, and in 2009 she was awarded a MacArthur Fellowship. She won the 2011 PEN/Faulkner Award for Fiction for The Collected Stories of Deborah Eisenberg.

Eisenberg received the PEN/Malamud Award for Excellence in the Short Story in May 2015.

Your Duck Is My Duck was one of three finalists for The Story Prize for the year 2018.

PEN controversy

In April 2015, in an exchange with American PEN's Executive Director Suzanne Nossel published in The Intercept by Glenn Greenwald, Eisenberg criticized PEN's decision to bestow its annual Freedom of Expression Courage Award to Charlie Hebdo, calling the choice "an opportunistic exploitation of the horrible murders in Paris to justify and glorify offensive material expressing anti-Islamic and nationalistic sentiments already widely shared in the Western world." Writers Michael Moynihan, Ophelia Benson and Katha Pollitt criticized her for comparing Charlie Hebdo to the Nazi publication Der Stürmer while Jacob Siegel said she had put "dead cartoonists on trial".

Joining Eisenberg in her protest of PEN's award ceremony were Peter Carey, Francine Prose, Teju Cole, Rachel Kushner and Taiye Selasi. In addition, 145 writers—including Junot Diaz, Lorrie Moore, Joyce Carol Oates and Michael Cunningham—signed a letter protesting PEN's decision. While calling the murders in the offices "sickening and tragic", the letter goes on to say, "PEN is not simply conveying support for freedom of expression but also valorizing selectively offensive material: material that intensifies the anti-Islamic, anti-Maghreb, anti-Arab sentiments already prevalent in the Western world."

Personal life
Eisenberg lives in the Chelsea neighborhood of New York City.

Her longtime companion is actor-writer Wallace Shawn. She was frequently referred to as "Debbie" in the film My Dinner With Andre, in which she also appears as a dining patron in the restaurant near the beginning.

Bibliography

Story collections

Play

Other

Short stories

Anthologies

References

External links

Deborah Eisenberg archive from The New York Review of Books

KCRW Bookworm Interview
Whiting Foundation Profile

1945 births
American actresses
American short story writers
Columbia University faculty
Columbia University people
Iowa Writers' Workshop faculty
Jewish American writers
Living people
MacArthur Fellows
Members of the American Academy of Arts and Letters
PEN/Faulkner Award for Fiction winners
People from Winnetka, Illinois
Place of birth missing (living people)
The New School alumni
The New Yorker people
University of Virginia faculty
PEN/Malamud Award winners
People from Chelsea, Manhattan
American women academics
21st-century American Jews
21st-century American women
O. Henry Award winners